East Otago is the name given to that part of Otago, in the South Island of New Zealand that lies directly to the north of Dunedin. To the south, its limit is approximately the rough hill pass of the Kilmog, 25 kilometres north of Dunedin city centre, and in the north the limit is the Shag River.

The population of East Otago is 2,500 (est 2001)

Expected population in 2006 is 3,000 with 1,400 expecting to live in the Main town of Waikouaiti

Census provisional count for East Otago as of 2006 was 4,991

Census provisional count for East Otago towns was:

Waikouaiti: 1,620
Palmerston: 1,246
Karitane: 720
Dunback: 320
Moeraki: 682

4,588 Live in the 5 main centers

403 Live in the rural areas

Total: 4,991

The area contains two main towns, Waikouaiti and Palmerston along with the smaller settlements of Karitane and Dunback.

The name East Otago has fallen somewhat out of favour since the expansion of the city limits of Dunedin to encompass much of this area in the 1990s.

See also
 Otago Gold Rush

Geography of Otago